Vila Matilde may refer to:
 Vila Matilde (São Paulo Metro)
 Vila Matilde (district of São Paulo)